Lake Youngs is a  reservoir in King County, Washington. It is located between Maple Valley and Renton along the route of pipelines carrying water from the Cedar River to Seattle, and is accessible only to Seattle Public Utilities staff and authorized visitors.

Originally the site of  Swan Lake, construction of the Lake Youngs reservoir began in earnest in the early 1920s and was completed by 1926. It was named for longtime Seattle Water Department head L. B. Youngs, who died in 1923. Lake Youngs is used as a visual checkpoint for pilots flying into and out of Renton Municipal Airport.

Lake Youngs is drained by Little Soos Creek.

See also
Lake Youngs Park

References

Lakes of King County, Washington
Reservoirs in Washington (state)